The Prize for Best Album (Prix du meilleur album), also known as the Fauve d'Or ("Golden Wildcat"), is awarded to comics authors at the Angoulême International Comics Festival.
As is the customary practice in Wikipedia for listing awards such as Oscar results, the winner of the award for that year is listed first, the others listed below are the nominees.

At the first two festivals (1974 and 1975), prizes were given only to creators, not books. From 1976 to 1978, the "best work" award was presented in four categories, foreign and French realistic and comical work. In 1981, the award was revived as simply "best album." From 1986 to 2001 it was again divided into two awards, French and foreign comic, but since 2002 it has once again returned to a single "best album" category.

1970s
 1976: Foreign comical work:  La tribu terrible (Redeye) by Gordon Bess (artist) and Greg (author), Le Lombard
 1976: Foreign realistic work:  Corto Maltese: La Ballade de la mer salée by Hugo Pratt, Casterman
 1976: French comical work:  Gai-Luron: En écrase méchamment by Gotlib, Vaillant
 1977: Foreign comical work:  Andy Capp: Si c'est pas pire, ça ira! by Reginald Smythe, SAGE
 1977: Foreign realistic work:  :  by Hans G. Kresse, Casterman
 1977: French realistic work:   by Annie Goetzinger, Glénat
 1978: Foreign comical work:  Boule et Bill by Roba, Dupuis
 1978: Foreign realistic work:   part 1 by José Antonio Muñoz (artist) and Carlos Sampayo (author), Ed. du Square
 1978: French comical work:  Le Génie des alpages:  by F'Murr, Dargaud
 1978: French realistic work:  Alix:  by Jacques Martin, Casterman
 (1979: no award in this category)

1980s
 (1980: no award in this category)
 1981:  by Carlos Giménez, AUDIE
 1981 (joint winner):   by Comès, Casterman
 1983: : Flic ou privé by José Antonio Muñoz and Carlos Sampayo, Casterman
 1984: : À la recherche des guerres perdues by Attilio Micheluzzi, Les Humanoïdes Associés
 1985: Les Cités Obscures: La fièvre d'Urbicande by François Schuiten and Benoît Peeters, Casterman
 '1986:  by Jerome Charyn and François Boucq,  Casterman
 1986: Foreign comic: Torpedo: Chaud devant by Jordi Bernet and Enrique Sánchez Abulí, Albin Michel
 1987: : Une nuit chez Tennessee by Jean-Pierre Autheman,  Dargaud
 1987: Foreign comic:   (Indian Summer) by Hugo Pratt and Milo Manara, Casterman
 1988: Foreign comic:  Maus: Un survivant raconte by Art Spiegelman, Flammarion
 1989 (special mention):  by Jean Teulé, Casterman
 1989: Foreign comic:  Les Gardiens (Watchmen): Ozymandias by Alan Moore and Dave Gibbons, Zenda

1990s
 1990:  by Jano, Albin Michel
 1990: Foreign comic:  V pour Vendetta (V for Vendetta): Visages by David Lloyd and Alan Moore, Zenda
 1991: Foreign comic:   by Miguelanxo Prado and Luna, Casterman
 1992:  by Edmond Baudoin, Futuropolis
 1992: Foreign comic:  Calvin & Hobbes: En avant tête de thon! by Bill Watterson, Hors Collection
 1993: Foreign comic:  Maus part 2 by Art Spiegelman, Flammarion
 1994:  by Fred, Dargaud
 1994: Foreign comic:  Trait de craie by Miguelanxo Prado, Casterman
 1995: Le cahier bleu by André Juillard, Casterman
 1995: Foreign comic:  : L’enfance by Vittorio Giardino, Casterman
 1996: Foreign comic:  Bone: La forêt sans retour by Jeff Smith, Delcourt
 1998: : Laid, pauvre et malade by Nicolas de Crécy and Sylvain Chomet, Casterman
 L'ascension du haut mal: Tome 2 (Epileptic) by David B., L'Association
 La Der des ders by Jacques Tardi and Didier Daeninckx, Casterman
 Houppeland: Tome 1 by Tronchet, Dupuis
 : Tome 1 by Jean-Pierre Gibrat, Dupuis
 1998: Foreign comic:  Fax de Sarajevo (Fax from Sarajevo) by Joe Kubert, Vertige Graphic
Chicanos by Eduardo Risso and Carlos Trillo, Vents d'Ouest
The Far Side by Gary Larson, Dupuis
Fleur de Pierre: Partisan by Hisashi Sakaguchi, Vents d'Ouest
L'île du Pacifique by Sergio Toppi, Mosquito
: L'apprentissage by Vittorio Giardino, Casterman
 1999: : Vivons heureux sans en avoir l'air by Dupuy and Berberian, Les Humanoïdes Associés
  by Étienne Davodeau, Delcourt
 Le Sommeil du monstre by Enki Bilal, Les Humanoïdes Associés
 1999: Foreign comic:  Cages by Dave McKean, Delcourt
Big Man by David Mazzucchelli, Cornélius
La vie est belle malgré tout (It's a Good Life, If You Don't Weaken) by Seth, Les Humanoïdes Associés

2000s
 : Le mexicain à deux têtes by Joann Sfar, Delcourt
 2000: Foreign comic:  Passage en douce: Carnet d'errance by Helena Klakocar, Fréon
300 by Frank Miller and Lynn Varley,  Rackham
L'Art invisible (Understanding Comics) by Scott McCloud, Vertige Graphic
Comme un gant de velours pris dans la fonte (Like a Velvet Glove Cast in Iron) by Daniel Clowes, Cornélius
Vieilles Canailles: L'esprit de famille by Trillo and Mandrafina,  Albin Michel
 2001: Jack Palmer: L'enquête corse by René Pétillon, Albin Michel
 Déogratias by Jean-Philippe Stassen, Dupuis
 2001: Foreign comic:   by Carlos Nine, Albin Michel
 part 3 by Jiro Taniguchi, Casterman
Gemma Bovery by Posy Simmonds, Denoël
Caricature by Daniel Clowes, Rackham
Grimmy part 10 by Mike Peters, Dargaud
 2002: : Les Amériques by Christophe Blain, Dargaud
 Frida Kahlo by Corona, Rackham
 Hicksville by Dylan Horrocks, L'Association
 La lecture des ruines by David B., Dupuis
 Pilules bleues by Frederik Peeters, Atrabile
 Uncle Sam by Steve Darnall and Alex Ross, Semic
 2003: Jimmy Corrigan (Jimmy Corrigan, the Smartest Kid on Earth) by Chris Ware, Delcourt
 Le Chat du rabbin: Le Malka des lions by Joann Sfar, Dargaud
 5 est le numéro parfait (5 is the Perfect Number) by Igort, Casterman
 David Boring by Daniel Clowes, Cornélius
 McCay: Les Cœurs retournés by Jean-Philipe Bramanti and Thierry Smolderen,  Delcourt
 Six cent soixante-seize apparitions de Killoffer (676 Apparitions of Killoffer) by Patrice Killoffer, L'Association
 2004: Le combat ordinaire: Tome 1 (Ordinary Victories) by Emmanuel Larcenet, Dargaud
 L'ascension du haut mal: Volume 6 (Epileptic) by David B., L'Association
 Blonde platine (Summer Blonde) by Adrian Tomine, Le Seuil
 Broderies (Embroideries) by Marjane Satrapi, L'Association
 Daredevil: Underboss and Daredevil: Le scoop by Brian Michael Bendis and Alex Maleev, Marvel
 Lupus: Tome 1 by Frédérik Peeters, Atrabile
 La vie de ma mère: Face A and Face B by Jean-Christophe Chauzy and Thierry Jonquet,  Gallimard
 2005: Poulet aux prunes by Marjane Satrapi, L'Association
  by Yoshiharu Tsuge, Ego comme X
 Louis Riel, l'insurgé (Louis Riel: A Comic-Strip Biography) by Chester Brown, Casterman
 Lupus: Tome 2 by Frédérik Peeters, Atrabile
 Mariée par correspondance by Kalesniko, Paquet
 Panorama de l'enfer by Hideshi Hino, Imho
 Une tragédie américaine (Boulevard of Broken Dreams) by Kim Deitch, Denoël Graphic
 2006:  by Gipi, Actes sud
 Les damnés de Nanterre by Chantal Montellier, Denoel graphic
 Fritz Haber: l'esprit du temps by David Vandermeulen, Delcourt
 Hanté by Philippe Dupuy, Cornélius
 Le petit bleu de la Côte Ouest by Jacques Tardi (after Manchette), Les Humanoïdes Associés
 Ripple by Dave Cooper, Le Seuil
 2007:  by Shigeru Mizuki, Cornélius
 2008: Là où vont nos pères (The Arrival) by Shaun Tan, Dargaud
 2009: Pinocchio by Winshluss', Les Requins Marteaux

2010s

 2010: : Tome 3 by Riad Sattouf (Audie)
 2012: Chroniques de Jérusalem (Jerusalem) by Guy Delisle (Delcourt)
 2013: Quai d'Orsay: Tome 2 by Christophe Blain and Abel Lanzac (Delcourt)
 2015: L'Arabe du futur by Riad Sattouf (Allary)
 2016: Ici by Richard McGuire (Gallimard)
 2017:  by  &  (Actes Sud BD / Frémok)
 2019: My Favorite Thing Is Monsters by Emil Ferris (Fantagraphics)

2020s
2021:  (The Hunting Accident) by Landis Blair and David L. Carlson (éditions Sonatine)
2022: Écoute, jolie Marcia'', by Marcello Quintanilha (Éditions Çà et là)

References

Best Comic Book